The flag of the French Southern and Antarctic Lands (French: Drapeau des Terres australes et antarctiques françaises) is a flag representing the overseas territory of France consisting of Adélie Land (Terre Adélie), the Crozet Islands (Îles Crozet), the Kerguelen Islands (Îles Kerguelen), Saint Paul and Amsterdam Islands (Îles Saint Paul et Amsterdam), and the Scattered Islands (Îles Éparses). The flag was adopted on 23 February 2007.

Description 
The flag is features the French tricolor in the canton, often displayed with a border of white. In the lower fly, the letters T.A.A.F (from the French name terres australes et antarctiques françaises) forms a monogram in white, which is stylized to resemble an anchor. The monogram is surrounded by five white stars. The stars are sometimes thought to represent each of the five regions of the territory, though this was not stated in the decree to adopt the flag.

History 

The first senior administrator of the territory, Xavier Richert, introduced a flag for his office. The flag, which was created in 1958, was nearly identical to the current one with the exception of having three stars instead of five. The three stars may have been in reference to his rank of Vice admiral, which is represented by three stars in the French Navy.

References

See also 

 List of French Flags
 Flag of Antarctica

Flags of Antarctica
Flags of France
Flags introduced in 1958
Flags introduced in 2007